Melaramanputhoor  is a place in the Nagercoil corporation of Kanyakumari district in the Indian state of Tamil Nadu. It is situated to the West of Ramanputhoor

References 

 Mela Raman Puthoor home page

Villages in Kanyakumari district